Binay Ranjan Sen, CIE, ICS (1 January 1898, Dibrugarh, India - 12 June 1993, Calcutta, India), was an Indian diplomat and Indian Civil Service officer. He served as Director General (1956–1967) of the UN's Food and Agriculture Organization (FAO). He drew on his experience as relief commissioner (1942–1943) during the Bengal famine of 1943 to build the FAO from a data-gathering bureaucracy into a major force against world hunger.
[[]]

Biography
He studied at the Scottish Church College of the University of Calcutta and subsequently at the University of Oxford. Sen joined the Indian Civil Service in Bengal in 1922. His work as director general of food for all India (1943–1946), for which he was appointed a Companion of the Order of the Indian Empire in 1944, convinced him that hunger and malnutrition were crucial issues in the modern world.

He took his concerns to the international stage as a member of India's first delegation to the UN (1947), as Indian Ambassador to the United States, and several other countries including Italy, Yugoslavia, Japan, and Mexico. He worked on a variety of FAO projects before being named Director General in 1956. While he was the Relief Commissioner(1942–43)in Bengal during Bengal famine,his mission of preventing hunger was set. In 1960, saying half the world's population was malnourished,Sen announced the Freedom from Hunger campaign. "Hunger is neither inevitable nor irremediable," he added, "it is within our power to bring this old affliction under control." This led to the 1963 World Food Congress in Washington, D.C., attended by representatives from more than 100 countries.

See also 
 Freedom from Hunger, US charity associated with the UN campaign

References

Further reading 
 Towards a Newer World by Dr. B. R. Sen, published by Tycooly International Publishing Ltd, Dublin

External links 
On the B.R.Sen Award - 1
On the B.R.Sen Award - 2
On the Second World Food Congress in The Hague, Netherlands 16-30 June 1970
Freedom from Hunger Campaign, Germany

Politicians from Kolkata
Bengali people
Food and Agriculture Organization officials
Scottish Church College alumni
University of Calcutta alumni
People from Dibrugarh district
Indian Civil Service (British India) officers
Ambassadors of India to the United States
Companions of the Order of the Indian Empire
Recipients of the Padma Vibhushan in civil service
1993 deaths
1898 births
Indian officials of the United Nations